N/A

References

External links
 https://www.ycombinator.com/companies/banabo
 https://www.banabo.io

Former communes of Ivory Coast
Populated places in Lacs District